The National Indigenous Australians Agency (NIAA) is an Australian Government agency responsible for whole-of-government coordination of policy development, program design, and service delivery for Aboriginal Australians and Torres Strait Islander people, who are grouped under the term Indigenous Australians.

Created in July 2019, the Agency is responsible to the Minister for Indigenous Australians, Linda Burney and is an executive agency of the Department of the Prime Minister and Cabinet, replacing the Department's Indigenous Affairs Group. The inaugural Chief Executive Officer is retired Vice Chief of the Defence Force, Ray Griggs. Jody Broun is set to take on a five year role as CEO from 14 February 2022.

History  
The agency was first announced by Prime Minister Scott Morrison on the 26 May 2019 after the return of the Liberal-National Coalition to government at the 2019 Federal Election. Prime Minister Morrison announced a ministerial reshuffle and machinery of government changes which elevated Minister for Aged Care and Indigenous Health Wyatt into the Cabinet of Australia as the Minister for Indigenous Australians and the creation of the National Indigenous Australians Agency within the Department of the Prime Minister and Cabinet, replacing the Department's Indigenous Affairs Group.

The National Indigenous Australians Agency was listed in the Commonwealth of Australia Gazette on the 29 May 2019 as the Order to Establish the National Indigenous Australians Agency as an Executive Agency under the Public Service Act 1999 to be formally established on the 1 July 2019.

Governance and responsibilities 
The National Indigenous Australians Agency is responsible to the Minister for Indigenous Australians and is an executive agency of the Department of the Prime Minister and Cabinet.

As outlined in the Order, the Agency is responsible for leading and coordinating policy development, program design and implementation and service delivery for Aboriginal and Torres Strait Islander people and providing advice to the Prime Minister and Minister for Indigenous Affairs on whole-of-government priorities. The agency is also responsible for the promotion of reconciliation, the Closing the Gap strategy, and monitoring and evaluation of programs.

Structure 
The NIAA is led by a CEO, Jody Broun, and two Deputy CEOs each with distinct responsibilities. As of 2022 the NIAA is organised as follows:

See also
Indigenous Advisory Council

References

External links

Commonwealth Government agencies of Australia
Indigenous Australian politics
Organisations serving Indigenous Australians